The 1981–82 season was Mansfield Town's 45th season in the Football League and 8th in the Fourth Division they finished in 20th position with 49 points.

Final league table

Results

Football League Fourth Division

FA Cup

League Cup

Squad statistics
 Squad list sourced from

References
General
 Mansfield Town 1981–82 at soccerbase.com (use drop down list to select relevant season)

Specific

Mansfield Town F.C. seasons
Mansfield Town